Trinity Episcopal Church, Chocowinity, North Carolina, is an Episcopal parish established in 1774 by the Reverend Nathaniel Blount.

History
In 1773, Nathaniel Blount sailed from Bath, NC to London, England to be ordained a priest.  The Bishop of London ordained Mr. Blount to the priesthood in Saint Paul's Cathedral, London.  Upon his return to Bath, "Parson Blount," as he was known, had a church built.  Giles Shute and John Herrington served as carpenters, according to a signed wooden panel in the sanctuary.  The little building became known as Blount's Chapel.

In 1826, the Right Rev'd John Stark Ravenscroft consecrated the building as Trinity Church, a parish in the Episcopal Diocese of North Carolina.  During the 19th century, the Grimes family were active in this parish.  The Grimes held large tracts of land in Beaufort and Pitt Counties.

The nearby town of Grimesland was named for them.  Major General Bryan Grimes of the Confederate Army was a member of the parish.  The parish's centennial in 1874 was marked by the addition of a formal chancel and sanctuary with stained glass windows.  In 1883, Trinity Church became part of the Episcopal Diocese of East Carolina, following the subdivision of the Diocese of North Carolina.

During the first half of the 20th century, the Rev'd N. C. Hughes, Jr, Trinity's rector, was influential in encouraging Chocowinity's citizens to retain the name of their town.  There were citizens who desired to change the name.  Belview was one of the names considered.  Hughes is also credited with learning the meaning of the name of the town from an Indian in South Carolina who offered a translation, "fish from many waters."  By keeping this Indian word, the town has retained a unique name for itself.

In 1939, the church building was moved on log rollers drawn by horses from its original location to a plot of land owned by the parish.  The parish hall (built ca 1900) already stood on this site, and the church was placed alongside that building.
A two-story addition was built in 1949 to provide room for Sunday School, offices, a kitchen, and general purpose space.
The historic chapel has remained in continuous use since it was built in 1774.
Trinity Church is located at 182 NC Hwy 33 West in Chocowinity.

Trinity Episcopal Cemetery

In the mid-19th century, land was given to the parish to serve as a cemetery.  Many notable town leaders and Beaufort County citizens were buried therein, including Revolutionary and Civil War veterans.  Penelope and Aspley Grist (sisters) donated further tracts of land to expand the cemetery.  The Major General Bryan Grimes cenotaph was erected in the center of the cemetery in his memory and has remained a popular site for Civil War enthusiasts and historians to visit.

The cemetery has continued to serve the parish and community to the present day.  In August 2011, the cemetery was added to the National Register of Historic Places.

List of Priests and Deacons who have served Trinity Episcopal Church 
 The Rev'd Nathaniel Blount
 The Rev'd Israel Harding
 The Rev'd Nathaniel Harding
 The Rev'd Nicholas Collin Hughes
 The Rev'd Nicholas Collin Hughes, Jr. (later served as Archdeacon of Raleigh)
 The Rev'd Alexander C. D. Noe
 The Rev'd Charles Malone
 The Rev'd Samuel Black
 The Rev'd James Alves
 The Rev'd Richard Ottaway
 The Rev'd Fred Ferris
 The Rev'd Kenneth Townsend
 The Rev'd Irwin Hulbert
 The Rev'd Jeremiah Day
 The Rev'd Lawrence P. Houston
 The Rev'd William Bomar Etters
 The Rev'd Michael C. Nation
 The Rev'd James Cooke
 The Rev'd J. M. Browne, III
Deacons
 The Rev'd Deacon Susan Moody DuVal
 The Venerable Joy Morgan Dosher

References

Further reading
 Parish Records, Trinity Episcopal Church, Chocowinity, NC, USA
 Beaufort County Courthouse Deedbooks
 A History of the Episcopal Church in North Carolina
 East Carolina University, Joyner Library, Repository for the Episcopal Diocese of East Carolina

Episcopal church buildings in North Carolina
Anglican cemeteries in the United States
Churches in Beaufort County, North Carolina
Cemeteries on the National Register of Historic Places in North Carolina
National Register of Historic Places in Beaufort County, North Carolina